Hugo Hernán Garay (born 27 November 1980) is an Argentine professional boxer who fights at light heavyweight.

Career
Garay won the silver medal in Buenos Aires World Junior Championships in 1998.  In the 1999 Pan American Games, he won the bronze medal in the men's light-heavyweight category.

Garay represented Argentina at the 2000 Summer Olympics. There he was stopped in the first round of the men's light-heavyweight division (– 81 kg) by Kazakhstan's Olzhas Orazaliev. He made his professional debut on 2001-07-14, defeating Abel Alejandro Rodríguez.

Garay was to fight champion Danny Green for the WBA Light Heavyweight Title on 27 April 2008 at Challenge Stadium in Perth, Australia.  However, following the sudden retirement of Green in March of that year, Garay fought Yuri Barashian instead on 3 July 2008 in Buenos Aires for the vacant belt, winning via twelve-round unanimous decision. On 22 November, he defeated Jürgen Brähmer by unanimous decision in his first title defense.

Garay has a record of 34 wins (18 KO's) and 5 (1 KO) losses. His nickname is "Pigu".

Professional boxing record

|-
| style="text-align:center" colspan=8|34 Wins (18 knockouts, 16 decisions) 7 Losses (3 knockouts, 4 decisions) 
|-
| style="text-align:center" style="border-style: none none solid solid; background: #e3e3e3"|Result
| style="text-align:center" style="border-style: none none solid solid; background: #e3e3e3"|Record
| style="text-align:center" style="border-style: none none solid solid; background: #e3e3e3"|Opponent
| style="text-align:center" style="border-style: none none solid solid; background: #e3e3e3"|Type
| style="text-align:center" style="border-style: none none solid solid; background: #e3e3e3"|Round
| style="text-align:center" style="border-style: none none solid solid; background: #e3e3e3"|Date
| style="text-align:center" style="border-style: none none solid solid; background: #e3e3e3"|Location
| style="text-align:center" style="border-style: none none solid solid; background: #e3e3e3"|Notes
|- style="text-align:center"
|Loss
|
| style="text-align:left" | Cesar David Crenz
|TKO
|5
|2011-10-14
| style="text-align:left" | Estadio Luna Park, Buenos Aires
| style="text-align:left" |
|- style="text-align:center"
|Loss
|
| style="text-align:left" | Marco Huck
|KO
|10
|2011-07-16
| style="text-align:left" | Olympia-Eissportzentrum, Munich, Bavaria
| style="text-align:left" |
|- style="text-align:center"
|Win
|
| style="text-align:left" | Martin David Islas
|UD
|6
|2011-04-08
| style="text-align:left" | Club Ciclista Juninense, Junin, Buenos Aires Province
| style="text-align:left" |
|- style="text-align:center"
|Win
|
| style="text-align:left" | Marcelo Leandro Da Silva
|KO
|1
|2010-08-14
| style="text-align:left" | Hogar de los Tigres, Sunchales, Santa Fe
| style="text-align:left" |
|- style="text-align:center"
|Loss
|
| style="text-align:left" | Chris Henry
|TKO
|1
|2010-03-27
| style="text-align:left" | Monterrey Arena, Monterrey, Nuevo Leon
| style="text-align:left" |
|- style="text-align:center"
|Loss
|
| style="text-align:left" | Gabriel Campillo
|MD
|12
|2009-06-20
| style="text-align:left" | Hogar de los Tigres, Sunchales, Santa Fe
| style="text-align:left" |
|- style="text-align:center"
|Win
|
| style="text-align:left" | Jürgen Brähmer
|UD
|12
|2008-11-22
| style="text-align:left" | Stadthalle, Rostock, Mecklenburg-Vorpommern
| style="text-align:left" |
|- style="text-align:center"
|Win
|
| style="text-align:left" | Yuriy Barashian
|UD
|12
|2008-07-03
| style="text-align:left" | Estadio Luna Park, Buenos Aires
| style="text-align:left" |
|- style="text-align:center"
|Win
|
| style="text-align:left" | Eduardo Franca
|KO
|2
|2007-11-25
| style="text-align:left" | Club Sportivo Barraca, Armstrong, Santa Fe
| style="text-align:left" |
|- style="text-align:center"
|Loss
|
| style="text-align:left" | Franco Raul Sanchez
|DQ
|2
|2007-10-27
| style="text-align:left" | CeDeM N 2, Caseros, Buenos Aires
| style="text-align:left" |
|- style="text-align:center"
|Win
|
| style="text-align:left" | Orlando Antonio Farias
|KO
|1
|2007-07-27
| style="text-align:left" | Hogar de los Tigres, Sunchales, Santa Fe
| style="text-align:left" |
|- style="text-align:center"
|Win
|
| style="text-align:left" | Alejandro Agustin Alvarez
|KO
|2
|2007-03-24
| style="text-align:left" | CeDeM N 2, Caseros, Buenos Aires
| style="text-align:left" |
|- style="text-align:center"
|Win
|
| style="text-align:left" | Fernando Roberto Vera
|KO
|4
|2006-12-16
| style="text-align:left" | Estadio Libertadores de America, Avellaneda, Buenos Aires Province
| style="text-align:left" |
|- style="text-align:center"
|Win
|
| style="text-align:left" | Gustavo Enriquez
|UD
|10
|2006-04-08
| style="text-align:left" | Estadio Luna Park, Buenos Aires
| style="text-align:left" |
|- style="text-align:center"
|Win
|
| style="text-align:left" | Cristian Dario Leal
|UD
|10
|2005-10-07
| style="text-align:left" | Estadio Luna Park, Buenos Aires
| style="text-align:left" |
|- style="text-align:center"
|Win
|
| style="text-align:left" | Miguel Angel Robledo
|TKO
|4
|2005-06-25
| style="text-align:left" | Club Aguada, Montevideo
| style="text-align:left" |
|- style="text-align:center"
|Loss
|
| style="text-align:left" | Zsolt Erdei
|SD
|12
|2005-02-26
| style="text-align:left" | Color Line Arena, Altona, Hamburg
| style="text-align:left" |
|- style="text-align:center"
|Win
|
| style="text-align:left" | Sergio Martin Beaz
|UD
|6
|2004-12-10
| style="text-align:left" | Club General Paz Juniors, Cordoba, Argentina
| style="text-align:left" |
|- style="text-align:center"
|Win
|
| style="text-align:left" | Felix Jose Hernandez
|KO
|6
|2004-11-10
| style="text-align:left" | CeDeM N 1, Caseros, Buenos Aires
| style="text-align:left" |
|- style="text-align:center"
|Win
|
| style="text-align:left" | Nestor Fabian Casanova
|KO
|1
|2004-08-21
| style="text-align:left" | CeDeM N 2, Caseros, Buenos Aires
| style="text-align:left" |
|- style="text-align:center"
|Loss
|
| style="text-align:left" | Zsolt Erdei
|MD
|12
|2004-05-08
| style="text-align:left" | Westfallenhalle, Dortmund, North Rhine-Westphalia
| style="text-align:left" |
|- style="text-align:center"
|Win
|
| style="text-align:left" | Sergio Martin Beaz
|UD
|12
|2004-02-21
| style="text-align:left" | Polideportivo Municipal Carlos Cerutti, Villa Carlos Paz, Córdoba Province, Argentina
| style="text-align:left" |
|- style="text-align:center"
|Win
|
| style="text-align:left" | Alejandro Lakatos
|TKO
|12
|2003-11-06
| style="text-align:left" | Pabellon B, Alcobendas, Comunidad de Madrid
| style="text-align:left" |
|- style="text-align:center"
|Win
|
| style="text-align:left" | Peter Venancio
|UD
|12
|2003-09-20
| style="text-align:left" | Conrad Hotel & Casino, Punta del Este
| style="text-align:left" |
|- style="text-align:center"
|Win
|
| style="text-align:left" | Sergio Martin Beaz
|UD
|10
|2003-07-12
| style="text-align:left" | Estadio FAB, Buenos Aires
| style="text-align:left" |
|- style="text-align:center"
|Win
|
| style="text-align:left" | Hector Ricardo Sotelo
|TKO
|1
|2003-05-24
| style="text-align:left" | Radisson Victoria Plaza, Montevideo
| style="text-align:left" |
|- style="text-align:center"
|Win
|
| style="text-align:left" | Peter Venancio
|KO
|4
|2003-03-22
| style="text-align:left" | Radisson Victoria Plaza, Montevideo
| style="text-align:left" |
|- style="text-align:center"
|Win
|
| style="text-align:left" | Hector Ricardo Sotelo
|UD
|8
|2003-02-15
| style="text-align:left" | Polideportivo Municipal Carlos Cerutti, Villa Carlos Paz, Córdoba Province, Argentina
| style="text-align:left" |
|- style="text-align:center"
|Win
|
| style="text-align:left" | Juan Eduardo Zabala
|TKO
|3
|2002-12-06
| style="text-align:left" | Hotel Cordoba Plaza, Cordoba, Argentina
| style="text-align:left" |
|- style="text-align:center"
|Win
|
| style="text-align:left" | Daniel Adrian Arruda
|TKO
|2
|2002-10-19
| style="text-align:left" | Estadio Luna Park, Buenos Aires
| style="text-align:left" |
|- style="text-align:center"
|Win
|
| style="text-align:left" | Hugo Ricardo Rodriguez
|UD
|6
|2002-09-13
| style="text-align:left" | Gimnasio Municipal N 1, Trelew, Chubut Province
| style="text-align:left" |
|- style="text-align:center"
|Win
|
| style="text-align:left" | Walter Fabian Basabez
|TKO
|1
|2002-08-31
| style="text-align:left" | Estadio Pascual Perez, Mendoza, Argentina
| style="text-align:left" |
|- style="text-align:center"
|Win
|
| style="text-align:left" | Jorge Enrique Arguello
|KO
|1
|2002-07-13
| style="text-align:left" | Estadio Luna Park, Buenos Aires
| style="text-align:left" |
|- style="text-align:center"
|Win
|
| style="text-align:left" | Hector Ricardo Sotelo
|UD
|8
|2002-05-25
| style="text-align:left" | Villa Gesell, Buenos Aires Province
| style="text-align:left" |
|- style="text-align:center"
|Win
|
| style="text-align:left" | Orlando Javier Acuna
|UD
|8
|2002-04-13
| style="text-align:left" | Estadio FAB, Buenos Aires
| style="text-align:left" |
|- style="text-align:center"
|Win
|
| style="text-align:left" | Adolfo Obando
|UD
|6
|2002-03-02
| style="text-align:left" | Estadio FAB, Buenos Aires
| style="text-align:left" |
|- style="text-align:center"
|Win
|
| style="text-align:left" | Aaron Orlando Soria
|UD
|4
|2002-01-19
| style="text-align:left" | Estadio FAB, Buenos Aires
| style="text-align:left" |
|- style="text-align:center"
|Win
|
| style="text-align:left" | Juan Eduardo Zabala
|TKO
|3
|2001-11-17
| style="text-align:left" | Estadio FAB, Buenos Aires
| style="text-align:left" |
|- style="text-align:center"
|Win
|
| style="text-align:left" | Jose Daniel Velazquez
|UD
|4
|2001-10-20
| style="text-align:left" | Estadio FAB, Buenos Aires
| style="text-align:left" |
|- style="text-align:center"
|Win
|
| style="text-align:left" | Gabriel Gustavo Heck
|RTD
|1
|2001-08-11
| style="text-align:left" | Estadio Malvinas Argentinas, Mendoza, Argentina
| style="text-align:left" |
|- style="text-align:center"
|Win
|
| style="text-align:left" | Abel Alejandro Rodriguez
|KO
|1
|2001-07-14
| style="text-align:left" | CeDeM N 2, Caseros, Buenos Aires
| style="text-align:left" |
|}

References

External links
 

1980 births
Living people
Light-heavyweight boxers
Boxers at the 1999 Pan American Games
Boxers at the 2000 Summer Olympics
Olympic boxers of Argentina
Sportspeople from Buenos Aires Province
Argentine male boxers
Pan American Games bronze medalists for Argentina
Pan American Games medalists in boxing
Medalists at the 1999 Pan American Games